"Here I Go Again" is a song by British rock band Whitesnake. Originally released on their 1982 album, Saints & Sinners, the power ballad was re-recorded for their 1987 self-titled album. It was re-recorded again the same year in a new "radio-mix" version, which was released as a single and hit No.1 on the Billboard Hot 100 chart on 10 October 1987 (the band's only No.1 on that chart), and also No.9 on the UK Singles Chart on 28 November 1987. The 1987 version also hit No.1 on the Canadian Singles Chart on 24 October 1987.

In 2003, Q magazine ranked it 962nd on their list of 1001 "Best Songs Ever". In 2006, the 1987 version was ranked No.17 on VH1's 100 Greatest Songs of the '80s. In the 2012 Reader's Poll of Rolling Stone it ranked as 9th among the Top 10 "The Best Hair Metal Songs of All Time". In 2017, The Daily Telegraph included it among Top 21 best power ballads.

Background and writing
The song was written by the lead singer, David Coverdale, and former Whitesnake guitarist, Bernie Marsden. The most notable difference between the original and re-recorded versions are a slight change in the bluesy lyrics and pace. The re-recording of the song in 1987 was advised by record labels bosses Al Coury and David Geffen as a negotiation deal with Coverdale to re-record "Crying in the Rain" for the band's self-titled album Whitesnake released in 1987.

The chorus of the original version features the lines:

And here I go again on my own
Goin' down the only road I've ever known
Like a hobo I was born to walk alone

In an interview, Coverdale explained that initially the lyrics had "drifter" but as that was already used in different songs he decided to use "hobo" instead. However, the lyric was changed back to "drifter" in the re-recorded '87 version, reportedly to ensure that it would not be misheard as "homo".

The song was used in the climax of romantic comedy film Man Up (2015).

Composition 
The song is composed in the key of G major and a tempo of 91 BPM.

Music video
The '82 music video features the band performing the song onstage. The music video for the '87 re-recorded version was directed by Marty Callner. The video includes, besides the band's stage performance, appearances by model Julie E. "Tawny" Kitaen, who was married to Whitesnake's David Coverdale from 1989 to 1991. Her notable sex-appeal was immediately recognized, having memorable unchoreographed scenes dressed "in a white negligee, writhing and cartwheeling across the hoods of two Jaguars XJ" which belonged to Coverdale (white) and Callner (black). Coverdale recalls that he even brought choreographer Paula Abdul to the set to show some moves to Coverdale's girlfriend Tawny, but only to positively exclaim that she couldn't "show her anything". Coverdale's iconic white Jaguar once again appeared in the music video for single "Shut Up & Kiss Me" from their 2019 studio album Flesh & Blood.

The song's 1987 music video was listed as one of the 15 Essential Hair-Metal Videos by the New York Times.

Single versions
There are several different versions of the song, all recorded officially by Whitesnake.

 The original version from the 1982 Saints & Sinners album with Jon Lord on Hammond organ and Bernie Marsden and Micky Moody on guitar (5:03)
 The most popular version is the re-recorded version that appears on the Whitesnake (aka 1987) album with John Sykes on guitar (solo by Adrian Vandenberg) (4:36)
 A 1987 "radio-mix" version, asked for by Geffen, which was released as a United States single with Denny Carmassi on drums and Dann Huff on guitar, who also provided the new arrangement, which included an intro without keyboards and no Coverdale vocal intro verse. This version topped the charts, and appeared on the Greatest Hits album in 1994 (3:54).

In 1987, EMI released a limited Collectors Poster Edition 'USA Single Remix' 7" vinyl [EMP 35], the B-side of which consists of an engraved signature version, and the sleeve of which unfolds into a poster of the band. In 1997 the band recorded an acoustic version, released on their Starkers in Tokyo live album.

Personnel
Original 1982 version from Saints & Sinners:

 David Coverdale – lead vocals
 Bernie Marsden – guitar
 Micky Moody – guitar, backing vocals
 Neil Murray – bass
 Ian Paice – drums
 Jon Lord – keyboards
 Mel Galley – backing vocals

1987 version from Whitesnake:

 David Coverdale – lead vocals
 John Sykes – guitar, backing vocals
 Neil Murray – bass
 Aynsley Dunbar – drums
 Adrian Vandenberg – guitar solo
 Don Airey – keyboards
 Bill Cuomo – keyboards

1987 radio-mix version:

 David Coverdale – lead vocals
 Dann Huff – guitar
 Mark Andes – bass
 Denny Carmassi – drums
 Don Airey – keyboards
 Bill Cuomo – keyboards

Chart performance
This song is notable for being the only Whitesnake song to get airplay on adult contemporary stations despite the fact "Is This Love" reached No.38 there and this song did not register at all on the AC charts.

Charts and certifications

Weekly charts

Year-end charts

All-time charts

Certifications

Cover versions
 A dance cover by Frash was a minor hit in the UK in 1995, reaching No.69.
 In 2004, a dance/pop take of "Here I Go Again" was recorded by Polish dancer and singer Mandaryna. Released as the debut single from her debut album Mandaryna.com, it became a hit in Poland. It was later remixed by Axel Konrad of Groove Coverage for the single release in German speaking countries.

References

External links
Here I Go Again 2017 Official Video Remix at official YouTube channel WhitesnakeTV
Here I Go Again 2020 HD at official YouTube channel WhitesnakeTV

1980s ballads
1982 singles
1982 songs
1987 singles
Billboard Hot 100 number-one singles
Cashbox number-one singles
Geffen Records singles
Mandaryna songs
Music videos directed by Marty Callner
RPM Top Singles number-one singles
Song recordings produced by Keith Olsen
Song recordings produced by Martin Birch
Song recordings produced by Mike Stone (record producer)
Songs about loneliness
Songs written by David Coverdale
Songs written by Bernie Marsden
Whitesnake songs
Glam metal ballads
British blues rock songs